The 2004 Philippine Basketball Association (PBA) rookie draft was an event at which teams drafted players from the amateur ranks. It was held on January 16, 2004 at the Glorietta Mall at Makati City. This is the last draft to be held within a calendar year.

Round 1

Round 2

San Miguel Beermen passed on this round.

Round 3

Red Bull Thunder, San Miguel Beermen and Sta. Lucia Realtors passed on this round.

Round 4

Purefoods Tender Juicy Hotdogs, Shell Turbo Chargers, Barangay Ginebra Kings,  Red Bull Thunder, Sta. Lucia Realtors and Talk 'N Text Phone Pals passed on this round.

Undrafted players
Draftee's name followed by college. All undrafted players become rookie free agents.

 Nurjamjam Alfad (San Sebastian)
 Francis Arabit (Letran)
 Julius Binuya
 Arnold Booker (UE)
 Joselito Celiz
 Tristan Codamon (Adamson)
 Jay-R Estrada (UE)
 Nicholas Joseph Fasano (Mesa)
 John Flores
 Lou Gatumbato (St. Benilde)
 Arvin Garcia (San Antonio)
 Lyndon Lagat from (DeVry)
 Jessie Lumantas from (Southwestern)
 Steve Marucot from (Mapua)
 Alvin Pua from (San Sebastian)
 Mario Reyes
 Richard Michael from (Sydney)
 Rommel Sungcap

Note
* All players are Filipinos until proven otherwise.

See also
2004 PBA Fiesta Conference
2004–05 PBA season

References

Philippine Basketball Association draft
draft